Wattle Park may refer to:

 Wattle Park, Melbourne, a park in Victoria, Australia
 Wattle Park, South Australia, a suburb of Adelaide